Alan Morse (born August 22, 1958) is an American guitarist for the progressive rock band Spock's Beard. He is the brother of co-founder Neal Morse, who left the band in 2002. Morse is married to Kathryn Morse and has two children, Julia and John.  He has recorded with many artists including Chad & Jeremy, Spencer Davis, Neal Morse, and (Spock's Beard keyboardist) Ryo Okumoto. Along with the guitar, he sings and plays the theremin, the cello, musical saw, keyboards, drums, bass & bouzouki. Morse has a degree in electrical engineering and owns an electronics manufacturing company, DynaMetric, Inc. Unusual for a rock guitar player, Morse does not use a pick.

Morse's first solo album, Four O'Clock & Hysteria, was released on April 13, 2007.

Discography
See also Spock's Beard.
 Alan Morse – Four O'Clock & Hysteria (2007)
 "Cold Fusion"
 "Return To Whatever"
 "Drive in Shuffle"
 "R Bluz"
 "First Funk"
 "Dschungel Cruz"
 "The Rite of Left"
 "Chroma"
 "Spanish Steppes"
 "Track 3"
 "Major Buzz"
 "Home"

References

External links
Spock's Beard official website
2010 interview with Alan Morse

1958 births
Living people
American rock guitarists
20th-century American guitarists